Selleophytum is a genus of flowering plants in the tickseed tribe within the daisy family.

The only known species is Selleophytum buchii, native to Haiti and the Dominican Republic.

References

Coreopsideae
Monotypic Asteraceae genera